USApple Association is a Virginia-based nonprofit membership association for growers, marketers, equipment producers, and allied organizations dealing with apples, within forty states of the United States of America. It advocates on behalf of 7,500 apple growers and 400 companies in the apple business. Their services include, but are not limited to, lobbying for the industry's interests at all the branches of the federal government and the public and to provide educational information, and newsletters for the growers. The association also strives to provide all involved in the U.S. apple industry the means to profitably produce and market apples and apple products.

The association's website supplies information for the public on all different apple cultivars grown in the United States. Currently, there are close to 100 U.S. cultivars grown commercially, but about 90% of the production consists of the 15 most popular cultivars.

References

External links 
 Official Website
 European Federation for Information Technology in Agriculture, Food and the Environment (archived)

Agricultural organizations based in the United States
Apples